Ice hockey at the 1999 Asian Winter Games took place in the Gangneung Indoor Ice Rink and the city of Gangneung, Gangwon, South Korea with men's and women's events contested.

Schedule

Medalists

Medal table

Final standing

Men

Women

References
Results of the Fourth Winter Asian Games
Kuwait cannot stop the goal rush
Kazakhstan wins last gold
China secures most medals

External links
Results Men
Results Women

 
1999
1999 Asian Winter Games events
Sports competitions in Pyeongchang County
Sports competitions in Gangneung
1999